Ernest Mayer (born 10 November 1920 in Zgornji Tuhinj, died 17 March 2009) was a Slovenian botanist

He studied Biology at the University of Ljubljana and at the University of Vienna. From September 1944 to December 1945, he was in the Yugoslav partisans and the Yugoslav People's Army. In 1947 he finished his studies in Vienna and graduated in botany as the main subject.

In 1947 he was appointed assistant trainee at the Botanical Institute of the University of Ljubljana, in due course becoming assistant, senior assistant, and assistant professor of botany. In 1956 he became an associate professor in the Natural Sciences and Mathematics Faculty, then a professor of botany at the Biotechnical Faculty in Ljubljana, the job he held until 1978. Then he transferred to the Jovan Hadži Institute of Biology, Slovenian Academy of Sciences and Arts where he was a senior scientist until his retirement in 1991.

His work primarily focussed on phytogeographic, morphological and taxonomic identification of higher plants that grow on the territory of the former Yugoslavia and the rest of the Balkan Peninsula, with an emphasis on endemics and polymorphism. He was author or co-author of over 100 scientific papers.

He was a member of many Yugoslav national and international societies and committees. He was the Regional Adviser on Yugoslavia for the Flora Europaea project up to 1992, and then assistant consultant for its continuation, the Helsinki-based Atlas Florae Europaeae. He became an associate member of the Slovenian Academy of Sciences and Arts in 1974, and a full member in 1983. From 1993 he was a regular member of the European Academy of Sciences and Arts. For his contribution to science he received the Jesenko Prize of the Biotechnical Faculty (1979)
and the Kidrič Award for lifetime achievement (1986).

Book translated into English

References 

Mayer, Ernest. Biographical note at Slovenska akademija znanosti in umetnosti (Slovenian Academy of Sciences and Arts)

1920 births
2009 deaths
Members of the Slovenian Academy of Sciences and Arts
Members of the European Academy of Sciences and Arts
Academic staff of the University of Ljubljana
Slovenian botanists
People from the Municipality of Kamnik
Yugoslav expatriates in Austria
Yugoslav botanists